is the Japanese word for voice actor.

Seiyu may also refer to:

Seiyu Group, a Japanese group of supermarkets, shopping centers and department stores.
Rikken Seiyūkai, known simply as Seiyūkai, a Japanese political party during the pre-war Empire of Japan.
Seiyūhontō (True Seiyū Party), a Japanese political party during the pre-war Empire of Japan that broke away from the Rikken Seiyūkai.